Harrison Matthew Symmes (November 11, 1921, Wilmington, North Carolina-May 8, 2010, Winchester, Virginia) was a career American diplomat who served as the American Ambassador to Jordan from 1967–1970. When he retired from the Foreign Service in 1974, Symmes became President of Windham College followed by becoming Resident Director of Mount Vernon in 1977.

Personal life
Symmes finished his bachelor's degree in Philosophy at the University of North Carolina at Chapel Hill and earned a master's degree in International Relations at George Washington University in 1947. From 1962–1963, he was at Harvard University’s Center for International Affairs based on being awarded a Harvard University Fellowship. He was a member of the National Honor Society, Phi Beta Kappa, and Pi Gamma Mu.

During World II, he served in the US Army (1942-1946) and entered the Foreign Service in 1947.  He died at his home of natural causes.

Career
Symmes spent almost three decades as an thirty years as an Arabic Language and Area Specialist at the State Department, going on to serve as Director of Near Eastern Affairs from 1963 to 1966, then Director of Personnel before his appointment as Ambassador.

On April 17, 1970, King Hussein asked that Symmes be recalled because the Assistant Secretary of State for Near Eastern and South Asian Affairs, Joseph J. Sisco, was not intending to stop in Jordan while he was in the Middle East.  The King blamed Symmes for the decision not to go to Amman.

After the West Bank was seized by Israel during the Six-Day War, members of the militant Palestinian group Fedayeen ultimately ”attacked” the US Embassy in Amman as part of a series of events “ seeking retribution for their dislocation.” As a result, Sisco cancelled the trip he had planned while he was in the region.  Hussein took this as a personal insult.,

Besides being posted in Jordan, Symmes also spent time posted in Egypt, Syria, Kuwait and Libya.

References

Ambassadors of the United States to Jordan
People from Wilmington, North Carolina
People from Winchester, Virginia
Elliott School of International Affairs alumni
University of North Carolina at Chapel Hill alumni
United States Foreign Service personnel
1921 births
2010 deaths
Harvard University people
United States Army personnel of World War II
American expatriates in Libya
American expatriates in Jordan
American expatriates in Kuwait
American expatriates in Syria
American expatriates in Egypt